Psilocybe thaicordispora is a species of psilocybin mushroom in the family Hymenogastraceae. The specific epithet thaicordispora refers to the section Cordisporae, and to Thailand.

See also
List of Psilocybe species
List of Psilocybin mushrooms

References

External links

Entheogens
Fungi described in 2012
Fungi of Asia
Psychoactive fungi
thaicordispora
Psychedelic tryptamine carriers
Taxa named by Gastón Guzmán